Hundred End railway station was on the West Lancashire Railway in England. It served the small community of Hundred End, so called because this was where the Leyland Hundred and West Derby Hundred met. It opened in 1878 and closed on 30 April 1962. Trains continued passing through the station until the line was closed in 1964

Hundred End Lane running from Marsh Road to Hundred End Station lies partly in Banks and partly in Hesketh Bank.

References

Disused railway stations in the Borough of West Lancashire
Former Lancashire and Yorkshire Railway stations
Railway stations in Great Britain opened in 1878
Railway stations in Great Britain closed in 1962